Olga Aleksandrovna Aroseva (21 December 1925 – 13 October 2013) was a Soviet and Russian actress whose career spanned more than 65 years. Aroseva was better known for her work in theater and for her voice work in animated television shows. In the years before her death, she was best known as a hostess of the Russian educational and variety show Long Time No See. Her movie roles included Beware of the Car.

Death
Aroseva died on 13 October 2013, aged 87, in Moscow, from undisclosed causes.

Selected filmography
Actor
 The Girl Without an Address (Девушка без адреса, 1957) as Neighbor
 Beware of the Car (Берегись автомобиля, 1966) as Lyuba, a trolley-bus driver
 Trembita (Трембита, 1968) as Parasya
 Two Days of Miracles (Два дня чудес, 1970) as Alfa Kokoshkina
 Grandads-Robbers (Старики-разбойники, 1971) as Anna Pavlovna
 Unbelievable Adventures of Italians in Russia (Невероятные приключения итальянцев в России, 1974) as Andrey's mother
 Svaty (Сваты, 2010-2012) as Lyudmila Koteeva
Voice
 The Kitten from the Lizyukov street (1988) as Elephant

Family
Olga Aroseva was married four times. Her third husband was singer Arkady Pogodin (from late 1960s or early 1970s until his death in 1975), and the fourth was actor Vladimir Soshalsky.

References

External links
 
 

1925 births
2013 deaths
Actresses from Moscow
Honored Artists of the RSFSR
People's Artists of the RSFSR
Recipients of the Decoration of Honor Meritorious for Polish Culture
Recipients of the Order "For Merit to the Fatherland", 3rd class
Recipients of the Order "For Merit to the Fatherland", 4th class
Recipients of the Order of Honour (Russia)
Russian film actresses
Russian stage actresses
Soviet film actresses
Soviet stage actresses